Christian Mayerhöfer (born 16 June 1971 in Mainz) is a German former field hockey player who competed in the 1992 Summer Olympics, in the 1996 Summer Olympics, and in the 2000 Summer Olympics.

References

External links
 

1971 births
Living people
German male field hockey players
Olympic field hockey players of Germany
Field hockey players at the 1992 Summer Olympics
Field hockey players at the 1996 Summer Olympics
Field hockey players at the 2000 Summer Olympics
Olympic gold medalists for Germany
Olympic medalists in field hockey
Sportspeople from Mainz
Medalists at the 1992 Summer Olympics
1998 Men's Hockey World Cup players
2002 Men's Hockey World Cup players
20th-century German people